Belgrano is a station on Line E of the Buenos Aires Underground.

The station was opened on 24 April 1966 as part of the extension of the line from San José to Bolívar. The name of the station pays homage to Manuel Belgrano, creator of the Argentinian flag.

The station is located at the intersection of the Julio Roca and Belgrano avenues.

Gallery

References

External links

Buenos Aires Underground stations
Railway stations opened in 1966
1966 establishments in Argentina